Hello Stranger (sometimes styled as Hello, Stranger) is a 2020 Philippine web series starring Tony Labrusca and JC Alcantara.

Directed by Petersen Vargas and produced by Black Sheep Productions, the series premiered on YouTube and Facebook on June 24, 2020, airing on Wednesdays at 8:30 PM PST. It concluded on August 19, 2020 and is available for streaming on iWantTFC. This series is currently available on Netflix PH May 10, 2021.

Plot 
Amidst the lockdowns due to the COVID-19 pandemic, two college boys in Adamson University are about to cross paths for a school project. Mico (JC Alcantara), a nerdy college student gets to partner with the star basketball player Xavier (Tony Labrusca). Despite their stark differences, the two boys get to form an unlikely bond that goes beyond friendship through their several online interactions.

Cast and characters 
Below are the cast of the series:

Main 
 Tony Labrusca as Xavier de Guzman
 JC Alcantara as Mico Ramos

Supporting 
 Vivoree Esclito as Kookai Yambao
 Patrick Quiroz as Seph Policarpio
 Miguel Almendras as Junjun Sandico
 Gillian Vicencio as Crystal Santos
 Meann Espinosa as Prof. Kristine Moran

Production 
On June 14, 2020, Black Sheep Productions, a division of ABS-CBN Films, previewed a teaser about their launching their first boys' love series at the height of the popularity of 2gether: The Series, a Thai boys' love series. Petersen Vargas, who also directed 2 Cool 2 Be 4gotten, Lisyun Qng Geografia, and Hanging Out, was named as the web series' director. Tony Labrusca was among the first cast revealed to be part of the series along with JC Alcantara, who played the role of Bogs in Halik. Aside from Labrusca and Alcantara, Gillian Vicencio, Vivoree Esclito, Patrick Quiroz and Miguel Almendras were also announced as part of the cast.

Episodes

Reception 
Its pilot episode garnered more than one million views from its digital medium several days after it was released on June 24, 2020. Prior to the release of its eighth and final episode, the web series accumulated more than fourteen million views. On August 16, 2020, the cast held its first digital fan conference.

Film sequel 
A full-length film sequel to the web series was announced by its lead actors during the digital fan conference on August 16, 2020 and was confirmed by Black Sheep Productions with a tweet saying "Not a Zoom movie guys, but an actual live movie!". The film sequel was released on 12 February 2021 on KTX, iWantTFC, TFC IPTV PPV, Sky Cable PPV and Cignal PPV.

Soundtracks

See also 
 Gameboys
 Gaya Sa Pelikula
 Ben X Jim
 Boys Lockdown
 Oh, Mando!
 The Boy Foretold by the Stars
 "Bad Buddy"

References

External links 
 Youtube Playlist
 Black Sheep Productions
 

2020 web series debuts
2020 web series endings
Philippine LGBT-related web series